"You and Your Friends" is a song by American rapper Wiz Khalifa, featuring fellow American rapper Snoop Dogg  and American singer Ty Dolla $ign from the former's fifth studio album Blacc Hollywood (2014). It was released on July 22, 2014 by Rostrum Records and Atlantic Records as the album's second official single. It was produced by DJ Mustard and Mike Free and is a bonus track on the deluxe version of Blacc Hollywood.

Music video
A music video for the song was released on December 22, 2014.

Charts

Weekly charts

Year-end charts

Certifications

References

2013 songs
2014 singles
Wiz Khalifa songs
Snoop Dogg songs
Ty Dolla Sign songs
Atlantic Records singles
Rostrum Records singles
Song recordings produced by Mustard (record producer)
Songs written by Wiz Khalifa
Songs written by Snoop Dogg
Songs written by Ty Dolla Sign
Songs written by Mustard (record producer)